= Cannon Coaster =

Wooden roller coaster at Coney Island

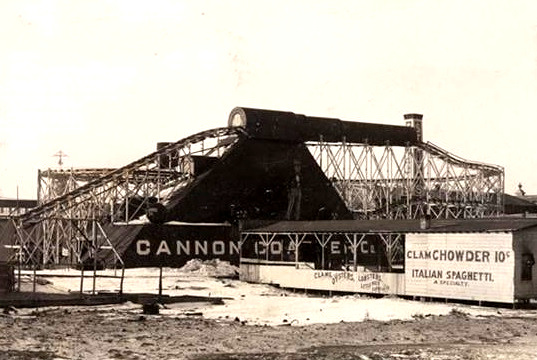

Coney Island
- Location: Coney Island
- Coordinates: 40.575°N 73.98°W
- Status: Removed
- Opening date: 1902
- Closing date: 1907

General statistics
- Type: Wood
- Manufacturer: George Francis Meyer
- Height: 40 ft (12 m)
- Cannon Coaster at RCDB

Cannon Coaster, sometimes known as Leap-the-Gap, was a wooden roller coaster which operated on Bowery Street in Coney Island, Brooklyn, New York, in the first decade of the 20th century.

== History ==
The Cannon Coaster was designed and built by George Francis Meyer. Accounts report the coaster opening in either 1901 or 1902 and then closing in 1907. The coaster was originally designed with the purpose of having cars race out of a giant cannon and then jump over a gap in the track (a so-called "leap-the-gap" maneuver), but this gap element was removed in response to safety testing. The coaster was tested with sandbags and while there were some occasional successes, it quickly became clear that changing the weight distribution in the cars even slightly would risk crashes. While no one was hurt or killed, urban legends persisted of fatalities during this testing period.

Though the gap was removed, the coaster retained its theme as a giant cannon. When riders reached the summit of the lift hill, they would pass through the "bore" of a cannon-shaped tunnel before speeding out from the "muzzle" of the cannon. The ride was actually described as being quite boring after the gap was removed, and its lingering popularity was thought to stem from the fictitious, yet gruesome, tales of death during its testing period.

== Marketing ==
The Cannon Coaster has also been noted in historical sources for the marketing which was employed to attract riders. The coaster owners utilized the excitement associated with roller coasters to hint at the amorous possibilities for young couples riding the coaster. One advertisement posed the question to riders: "Will she throw her arms around your neck and yell? Well, I guess yes!"
